Jonatan Lucca (born 2 June 1994) is a Brazilian professional footballer who plays for Eliteserien club Stabæk as a midfielder.

Career

A.S. Roma
Lucca was signed by Italian giants Roma from Brazilian side Internacional in July 2012 under Czech manager Zdenek Zeman. While he never appeared during the season in the league, he was a fairly regular substitute for the Italian side during the 2012–13, being named on the bench during 13 Serie A games. failing to gain any game time, he was loaned out to Brazilian side Atlético Paranaense during 2014.

Atletico Paranaense
Lucca made his senior debut in the Parana state league in the Campeonato Paranaense in 2014 where he made 4 appearances, before he was signed on a permanent basis by Atlético Paranaense in July 2015. He continued to play in the Parana in 2015 where he made 5 appearances. He was one of thirteen of Atletico's players loaned out to Brazilian third-division side Guaratinguetá in the Campeonato Brasileiro Série C, where he finally made his senior professional league debut, and going on to make 3 appearances.

Asia
Lucca is loaned out to Indian Super League club FC Goa under Zico for the 2015 Indian Super League season.

He was seen at Kuala Lumpur International Airport and later was confirmed to be Kelantan FA new signing. On 2 June, his contract was terminated by Kelantan FA and the announcement was made by KAFA president after head coach Velizar Popov does not have plans for the duo Jonatan Lucca and Dramane Traore in the second half of the season.

On 24 August 2017, Lucca returned to Indian Super League with FC Pune City after a brief stint with Israeli club Bnei Sakhnin. On 23 November, he made his debut, starting in a 2–3 defeat against Delhi Dynamos FC. One month later, he scored his first goal in a 2-0 victory against FC Goa.
On 11 March, he scored a freekick goal against Bengaluru FC but his side lost 3-1 on aggregate.

Portugal
On 6 June 2018, Lucca moved to Portuguese club C.F. Os Belenenses on a three-year contract. In January 2020 he moved on to S.C. Farense, contesting the 2020–21 Primeira Liga.

Norway
After some months without a club, Lucca signed for Norwegian club Stabæk.

Personal life
Lucca's brother, Cristian Lucca, is also a professional footballer.

Honours

Club
A.S. Roma
Coppa Italia runner-up: 2012–13
FC Goa
Indian Super League runner-up: 2015

References

1994 births
Living people
Brazilian footballers
Association football midfielders
Club Athletico Paranaense players
FC Goa players
Kelantan FA players
FC Pune City players
Bnei Sakhnin F.C. players
Indian Super League players
Israeli Premier League players
Primeira Liga players
Brazilian expatriate footballers
Brazilian expatriate sportspeople in India
Brazilian expatriate sportspeople in Malaysia
Brazilian expatriate sportspeople in Israel
Expatriate footballers in India
Expatriate footballers in Malaysia
Expatriate footballers in Israel
Belenenses SAD players
S.C. Farense players
Expatriate footballers in Portugal
Brazilian expatriate sportspeople in Portugal
Stabæk Fotball players
Expatriate footballers in Norway
Brazilian expatriate sportspeople in Norway